James "Jazza" Dickens (born 12 April 1991) is a British professional boxer who challenged for the WBA (Super) super bantamweight title in 2016 and the IBF featherweight title in 2021, as of october 2022 he is the IBO featherweight world champion. At national level, he held the British super bantamweight title from 2015 to 2017.

Career
Born in Mill Lane Hospital, Liverpool, Dickens took up boxing at the age of 12 at the Salisbury ABC; After two years he moved on to the Golden Gloves ABC before moving on again to the Everton Red Triangle Boxing Club, representing his country many times at junior level. He won the senior ABA bantamweight title in 2010.

After missing out on selection for the Commonwealth Games, he turned professional, making his pro debut in January 2011. He won his first thirteen fights, including victories over Yuriy Voronin and Franklin Varela, before facing the also unbeaten Jon Fernandes in March 2013 for the vacant English super-bantamweight title at the Echo Arena, Liverpool. Dickens took a unanimous decision to become English champion.

Dickens won his next two fights against Dai Davies and Reynaldo Cajina, before meeting Kid Galahad for the vacant British super-bantamweight title in September 2013. Galahad stopped Dickens in the tenth round, inflicting the first defeat of his professional career.

Dickens won his next two fights before getting a second chance at the British title after Gavin McDonnell vacated it. He faced Josh Wale at the Echo Arena in March 2015, this time winning via unanimous decision to add the British title to his English title.

He beat Arnoldo Solano on points in July 2015.

On 16 July 2016, Dickens challenged Guillermo Rigondeaux for the WBA (Super) super-bantamweight title. Dickens' corner pulled him out of the fight after round two, after it was discovered that a big left hand by Rigonedaux had fractured Dickens' jaw.

In his next fight, Dickens fought Thomas Patrick Ward in a bid to defend his British super-bantamweight title. Despite Ward's strong start, Dickens seemed to be the one racking up the points in the early rounds. This would be the case, until a sudden turn in the fight in which Ward started to punish Dickens. In the ninth round, Ward was pushed to the canvas, which opened up a cut above his left eye, leading the referee to stop the fight on the advice of the ringside doctor. At the time of stoppage the scorecards were 85–87, 84–88, and 85–87 in favor of the challenger. Ward won the fight by technical decision.

Golden Contract tournament 
In the semi-finals, Dickens battled fellow Brit Leigh Wood. Early in the fight, Dickens had swelling over his left eye, but managed to put on a very good performance throughout the fight. Dickens, who was ranked #3 at featherweight by the IBF at the time, managed to snatch a majority decision victory.

Professional boxing record

{|class="wikitable" style="text-align:center"
|-
!
!Result
!Record
!Opponent
!Type
!Round, time
!Date
!Location
!Notes
|-
|36
|Win
|32–4
|align=left|Lerato Dlamini
|UD
|12
|15 Oct 2022
|align=left|
|align=left|
|-
|35
|Win
|31–4
|align=left|Andoni Gago
|KO
|5 (10), 
|22 Apr 2022
|align=left|
|
|-
|34
|Loss
|30–4
|align=left|Kid Galahad
|RTD
|11 (12), 
|7 Aug 2021
|align=left|
|align=left|
|-
|33
|Win
|30–3
|style="text-align:left;"|Ryan Walsh
|UD
|10
|2 Dec 2020
|style="text-align:left;"|
|style="text-align:left;"|
|-
|32
|Win
|29–3
|style="text-align:left;"|Leigh Wood
|MD
|10
|21 Feb 2020
|style="text-align:left;"|
|style="text-align:left;"|
|-
|31
|Win
|28–3
|style="text-align:left;"|Carlos Ramos
|UD
|10
|4 Oct 2019
|style="text-align:left;"|
|style="text-align:left;"|
|-
|30
|Win
|27–3
|style="text-align:left;"|Nathaniel May
|UD
|10
|12 Jul 2019
|style="text-align:left;"|
|style="text-align:left;"|
|-
|29
|Win
|26–3
|style="text-align:left;"|Nasibu Ramadhani 
|TKO
|5 (10), 
|19 Apr 2019
|style="text-align:left;"|
|
|-
|28
|Win
|25–3
|style="text-align:left;"|Miguel Encarnacion
|TKO
|1 (8), 
|9 Nov 2018
|style="text-align:left;"|
|
|-
|27
|Win
|24–3
|style="text-align:left;"|Pablo Narvaez
|KO
|1 (6), 
|27 Jul 2018
|style="text-align:left;"|
|
|-
|26
|Win
|23–3
|style="text-align:left;"|Barnie Arguelles
|TKO
|5 (6)
|2 Mar 2018
|style="text-align:left;"|
|
|-
|25
|Loss
|22–3
|style="text-align:left;"|Thomas Patrick Ward
|
|9 (12), 
|13 May 2017
|style="text-align:left;"|
|style="text-align:left;"|
|-
|24
|Loss
|22–2
|style="text-align:left;"|Guillermo Rigondeaux
|RTD
|2 (12), 
|16 Jul 2016
|style="text-align:left;"|
|style="text-align:left;"|
|-
|23
|Win
|22–1
|style="text-align:left;"|Reynaldo Cajina
|RTD
|7 (8), 
|12 Mar 2016
|style="text-align:left;"|
|
|-
|22
|Win
|21–1
|style="text-align:left;"|Martin Ward
|
|12
|20 Nov 2015
|style="text-align:left;"|
|style="text-align:left;"|
|-
|21
|Win
|20–1
|style="text-align:left;"|Arnoldo Solano
|PTS
|6
|25 Jul 2015
|style="text-align:left;"|
|
|-
|20
|Win
|19–1
|style="text-align:left;"|Josh Wale
|UD
|12
|6 Mar 2015
|style="text-align:left;"|
|style="text-align:left;"|
|-
|19
|Win
|18–1
|style="text-align:left;"|Giorgi Gachechiladze
|TKO
|2 (8), 
|25 Oct 2014
|style="text-align:left;"|
|
|-
|18
|Win
|17–1
|style="text-align:left;"|Krzysztof Rogowski
|PTS
|6
|8 Mar 2014
|style="text-align:left;"|
|
|-
|17
|Loss
|16–1
|style="text-align:left;"|Kid Galahad
|TKO
|10 (12), 
|14 Sep 2013
|style="text-align:left;"|
|style="text-align:left;"|
|-
|16
|Win
|16–0
|style="text-align:left;"|Reynaldo Cajina
|PTS
|4
|6 Jul 2013
|style="text-align:left;"|
|
|-
|15
|Win
|15–0
|style="text-align:left;"|Dai Davies
|PTS
|10
|24 May 2013
|style="text-align:left;"|
|
|-
|14
|Win
|14–0
|style="text-align:left;"|Jon Fernandes
|
|10
|30 Mar 2013
|style="text-align:left;"|
|style="text-align:left;"|
|-
|13
|Win
|13–0
|style="text-align:left;"|Franklin Varela
|PTS
|8
|24 Nov 2012
|style="text-align:left;"|
|
|-
|12
|Win
|12–0
|style="text-align:left;"|Michael Isaac Carrero
|TKO
|6 (8), 
|5 Oct 2012
|style="text-align:left;"|
|
|-
|11
|Win
|11–0
|style="text-align:left;"|Kristian Laight
|PTS
|6
|29 Jul 2012
|style="text-align:left;"|
|
|-
|10
|Win
|10–0
|style="text-align:left;"|Yuriy Voronin
|TKO
|4 (6), 
|21 Apr 2012
|style="text-align:left;"|
|
|-
|9
|Win
|9–0
|style="text-align:left;"|Janis Puksins
|TKO
|3 (6), 
|10 Mar 2012
|style="text-align:left;"|
|
|-
|8
|Win
|8–0
|style="text-align:left;"|Barrington Brown
|PTS
|6
|4 Feb 2012
|style="text-align:left;"|
|
|-
|7
|Win
|7–0
|style="text-align:left;"|Dougie Curran
|PTS
|4
|16 Dec 2011
|style="text-align:left;"|
|
|-
|6
|Win
|6–0
|style="text-align:left;"|James Ancliff
|
|2 (6), 
|12 Nov 2011
|style="text-align:left;"|
|
|-
|5
|Win
|5–0
|style="text-align:left;"|Chris Riley
|PTS
|4
|30 Sep 2011
|style="text-align:left;"|
|
|-
|4
|Win
|4–0
|style="text-align:left;"|Chuck Jones
|PTS
|4
|30 Jul 2011
|style="text-align:left;"|
|
|-
|3
|Win
|3–0
|style="text-align:left;"|Stoyan Serbezov
|PTS
|4
|20 May 2011
|style="text-align:left;"|
|
|-
|2
|Win
|2–0
|style="text-align:left;"|Sali Mustafov
|
|1 (4), 
|26 Mar 2011
|style="text-align:left;"|
|
|-
|1
|Win
|1–0
|style="text-align:left;"|Pavels Senkovs
|
|4
|22 Jan 2011
|style="text-align:left;"|
|

References

External links

Jazza Dickens - Profile, News Archive & Current Rankings at Box.Live

1991 births
Living people
Boxers from Liverpool
English male boxers
Super-bantamweight boxers